Lashovo is a rural locality (a village) in Niginskoye Rural Settlement, Nikolsky District, Vologda Oblast, Russia. The population was 53 as of 2002.

Geography 
Lashovo is located 21 km northwest of Nikolsk (the district's administrative centre) by road. Petryanino is the nearest rural locality.

References 

Rural localities in Nikolsky District, Vologda Oblast